"Star Light" is a song recorded by Japanese R&B singer Toshinobu Kubota for his fifteenth studio album, Timeless Fly.

Overview
"Star Light" was released on January 27, 2010, as the B side to "Tomorrow Waltz", the fourth single from the album Timeless Fly. The song was released as a tribute to Michael Jackson, who died in June 2009.

Track listing
CD Single
 "Tomorrow Waltz"
 "Star Light"
 "Ooh Wee Rida"

References

2010 singles
2010 songs
Toshinobu Kubota songs
Songs written by Toshinobu Kubota
SME Records singles